The Lake Manpo and Lake Bonpo Important Bird Area lies within the Rason Special Economic Zone on the coast of north-eastern North Korea, close to its borders with both China and Russia.  The 5880 ha site comprises the freshwater lakes, which lie about 3 km apart, and encompasses the 3200 ha Lake Manpo and Lake Bonpo Protected Area.  It has been identified by BirdLife International as an Important Bird Area (IBA) because it supports populations of various water- and wetland birds including swan geese, greater white-fronted geese, whooper swans, Oriental storks, white-naped cranes and red-crowned cranes.  It is threatened by planned aquacultural development.

References

Important Bird Areas of North Korea
Manpo
Rason